Arthur Cotton (9 January 1853 – 6 December 1920) was an Australian politician in Tasmania.

He was born in Cranbrook in Tasmania. In 1913 he was elected to the Tasmanian House of Assembly as a Liberal member for Franklin. He was defeated in 1916 but returned in a by-election in 1917 after the appointment of John Earle to the Senate. He was defeated again in 1919 and died in Swansea in 1920.

References

1853 births
1920 deaths
Commonwealth Liberal Party politicians
Nationalist Party of Australia members of the Parliament of Tasmania
Members of the Tasmanian House of Assembly